Bianca Lamblin (born Bienenfeld; 1921 – 5 November 2011) was a French writer who had affairs with philosophers Jean-Paul Sartre and Simone de Beauvoir for a number of years. In her book Mémoires d'une jeune fille dérangée (published in English as A Disgraceful Affair), she wrote that, while a student at Lycée Molière, she was sexually exploited by her teacher Beauvoir, who was in her 30s. In correspondence between Sartre and Beauvoir, the pseudonym Louise Védrine was used when referring to Bianca in Lettres au Castor and Lettres à Sartre.

Biography 
Bianca Lamblin was born in 1921 in Lublin, to Jewish parents. She was a cousin of the French writer Georges Perec. In 1937, her teacher was Simone de Beauvoir. She also met Sartre at this time. In Paris, Bianca was friends with Jean Kanapa, Yvonne Picard, Raoul Lévy and Bernard Lamblin. She married Bernard Lamblin and they had two children. Bianca became a teacher, and after Simone de Beauvoir's death, Bianca wrote Mémoires d'une jeune fille dérangée.

Bibliography 
 Mémoires d'une jeune fille dérangée (1994, LGF - Livre de Poche; /2006, Balland)

See also
 Olga Kosakiewicz
 Natalie Sorokin

References

Sources
Jean-Paul Sartre (1983). Lettres au Castor et à quelques autres, tome 1 : 1926-1939. Paris: Gallimard. 
Simone de Beauvoir (1990). Lettres à Sartre, tome 1 : 1930-1939. Paris: Gallimard. 
Deirdre Blair (1991). Simone de Beauvoir: A Biography. New York: Touchstone. 

1921 births
2011 deaths
French memoirists
Jean-Paul Sartre
Place of death missing
Simone de Beauvoir
French women memoirists
20th-century French women writers
Writers from Lublin
Polish emigrants to France